The following is a list of diplomatic missions of South Korea. Diplomatic missions of the South Korea shall be established in foreign countries under the jurisdiction of the Minister of Foreign Affairs to take partial charge of diplomatic or consular affairs under the control of the Ministry of Foreign Affairs. The kinds of Diplomatic missions of the South Korea shall be classified into Embassy, Representative Office and Consulate-General. According to the Act on the Establishment of Diplomatic missions abroad of South Korea, Consulate and Consular Office may be established in the missions, as prescribed by Presidential Decree, if necessary to assign the said offices with affairs under the jurisdiction of the missions.

History
In the 1980s the Roh Tae-woo administration gradually initiated diplomatic links with Warsaw Pact countries, in a policy known as Nordpolitik. This led to the opening of representative offices and later embassies in socialist regimes in Europe and Asia. The Asian economic crisis of the late 1990s and an export-orientated trade policy led to South Korea to rationalize its diplomatic network. However, after bouncing back from the crisis, South Korea continues to open and re-open diplomatic missions in many countries. With neither North Korea or South Korea recognizing the sovereignty of the other state, nor the legitimacy of each other's governments, there are no South Korean diplomatic missions in North Korea.

Africa

 Algiers (Embassy)

 Luanda (Embassy)

 Yaoundé (Embassy)

 Kinshasa (Embassy)

 Cairo (Embassy)

 Addis Ababa (Embassy)

 Malabo (Embassy branch office)

 Libreville (Embassy)

 Accra (Embassy)

 Abidjan (Embassy)

 Nairobi (Embassy)

 Tripoli (Embassy)

 Antananarivo (Embassy)

 Rabat (Embassy)

 Maputo (Embassy)

 Abuja (Embassy)
 Lagos (Consulate)

 Kigali (Embassy)

 Dakar (Embassy)

 Pretoria (Embassy)

 Khartoum (Embassy)

 Dar es Salaam (Embassy)

 Tunis (Embassy)

 Kampala (Embassy)

 Harare (Embassy)

Americas

 Buenos Aires (Embassy)

 La Paz (Embassy)

 Brasilia (Embassy)
 São Paulo (Consulate-General)

 Ottawa (Embassy)
 Montreal (Consulate-General)
 Toronto (Consulate-General)
 Vancouver (Consulate-General)

 Santiago de Chile (Embassy)

 Bogotá (Embassy)

 San José (Embassy)

 Santo Domingo (Embassy)

 Quito (Embassy)

 San Salvador (Embassy)

 Guatemala City (Embassy)

 Tegucigalpa (Embassy)

 Kingston (Embassy)

 Mexico City (Embassy)

 Managua (Embassy)

 Panama City (Embassy)

 Asunción (Embassy)

 Lima (Embassy)

 Port of Spain (Embassy)

 Washington, D.C. (Embassy)
 Atlanta (Consulate-General)
 Boston (Consulate-General)
 Chicago (Consulate-General)
 Honolulu (Consulate-General)
 Houston (Consulate-General)
 Los Angeles (Consulate-General)
 New York City (Consulate-General)
 San Francisco (Consulate-General)
 Seattle (Consulate-General)
 Anchorage (Consular Office)
 Dallas (Consular Office)
 Hagåtña (Consular Office)
 Philadelphia (Consular Office)

 Montevideo (Embassy)

 Caracas (Embassy)

Asia

 Baku (Embassy)

 Dhaka (Embassy)

 Manama (Embassy)

 Bandar Seri Begawan (Embassy)

 Phnom Penh (Embassy)
 Siem Reap (Consulate)

 Beijing (Embassy)
 Chengdu (Consulate-General)
 Guangzhou (Consulate-General)
 Hong Kong (Consulate-General)
 Qingdao (Consulate-General)
 Shanghai (Consulate-General)
 Shenyang (Consulate-General)
 Wuhan (Consulate-General)
 Xi'an (Consulate-General)
 Dalian (Consular Office)

 Dili (Embassy)

 Tbilisi (Embassy Branch Office)

 New Delhi (Embassy)
 Chennai (Consulate-General)
 Mumbai (Consulate-General)

 Jakarta (Embassy)
 Bali (Consulate)

 Tehran (Embassy)

 Baghdad (Embassy)
 Erbil (Consulate)

 Tel Aviv (Embassy)

 Tokyo (Embassy)
 Fukuoka (Consulate-General)
 Hiroshima (Consulate-General)
 Kobe (Consulate-General)
 Nagoya (Consulate-General)
 Niigata (Consulate-General)
 Osaka (Consulate-General)
 Sapporo (Consulate-General)
 Sendai (Consulate-General)
 Yokohama (Consulate-General)

 Amman (Embassy)

 Astana (Embassy)
 Almaty (Consulate-General)

 Kuwait City (Embassy)

 Bishkek (Embassy)

 Vientiane (Embassy)

 Beirut (Embassy)

 Kuala Lumpur (Embassy)

 Ulaanbaatar (Embassy)

 Yangon (Embassy)

 Kathmandu (Embassy)

 Muscat (Embassy)

 Islamabad (Embassy)
 Karachi (Consulate)

 Ramallah (Representative Office)

 Manila (Embassy)
 Cebu (Consulate)

 Doha (Embassy)

 Riyadh (Embassy)
 Jeddah (Consulate-General)

 Singapore (Embassy)

 Colombo (Embassy)

 Taipei (Mission)

 Dushanbe (Embassy)

 Bangkok (Embassy)

Ankara (Embassy)
 Istanbul (Consulate-General)

 Ashgabat (Embassy)

 Abu Dhabi (Embassy)
 Dubai (Consulate-General)

 Tashkent (Embassy)

 Hanoi (Embassy)
 Da Nang (Consulate-General)
 Ho Chi Minh City (Consulate-General)

Europe

 Vienna (Embassy)

 Minsk (Embassy)

 Brussels (Embassy)

 Sofia (Embassy)

 Zagreb (Embassy)

 Prague (Embassy)

 Copenhagen (Embassy)

 Helsinki (Embassy)

 Paris (Embassy)

 Berlin (Embassy)
 Bonn (Embassy branch office)
 Frankfurt (Consulate-General)
 Hamburg (Consulate-General)

 Athens (Embassy)

 Rome (Embassy)

 Budapest (Embassy)

 Dublin (Embassy)

 Rome (Embassy)
 Milan (Consulate-General)

 Riga (Embassy)

 The Hague (Embassy)

 Oslo (Embassy)

 Warsaw (Embassy)

 Lisbon (Embassy)

 Bucharest (Embassy)

 Moscow (Embassy)
 Irkutsk (Consulate-General)
 Saint Petersburg (Consulate-General)
 Vladivostok (Consulate-General)
 Yuzhno-Sakhalinsk (Consular Office)

 Belgrade (Embassy)

 Bratislava (Embassy)

 Madrid (Embassy)
 Barcelona (Consulate-General)
 Las Palmas (Consulate)

 Stockholm (Embassy)

 Bern (Embassy)

 Kyiv (Embassy)

 London (Embassy)

Oceania

 Canberra (Embassy)
 Sydney (Consulate-General)
 Melbourne (Consulate)
 Brisbane (Consular Office)

 Suva (Embassy)

 Wellington (Embassy)
 Auckland (Consulate)

 Port Moresby (Embassy)

International organizations
 
 Addis Ababa (Mission)
 
 Jakarta (Mission)
 
Brussels (Permanent Mission)
  International Civil Aviation Organization
 Montreal (Permanent Mission)
 
Brussels (Permanent Mission)
  OECD
 Paris (Permanent Delegation)
  UNESCO
 Paris (Permanent Delegation)
  and specialized agencies
 New York City (Permanent Mission)
 Geneva (Permanent Mission)
 The Hague (Permanent Mission)
 Vienna (Permanent Mission)

Gallery

Accredited diplomatic missions 
Cities of residence are in parenthesses

See also
 Foreign relations of South Korea
 List of diplomatic missions in South Korea
 List of ambassadors of South Korea
 Visa policy of South Korea

Notes

References

External links

 The Ministry of Foreign Affairs of the Republic of Korea

 
Korea, South
Diplomatic missions